The 1932 Michigan gubernatorial election was held on November 8, 1932. Democratic nominee William Comstock defeated incumbent Republican Wilber M. Brucker with 54.92% of the vote.

General election

Candidates
Major party candidates
William Comstock, Democratic 
Wilber M. Brucker, Republican
Other candidates
John Panzer, Socialist
William Reynolds, Communist
Charles Elwood Holmes, Prohibitionist
Robert Fraser, Socialist Labor
Al Renner, Proletarian
Anthony Bergman, Liberty

Results

Primaries

Democratic Primary

Republican Primary

References

1932
Michigan
Gubernatorial
November 1932 events in the United States